These are geographic anagrams and anadromes. Anagrams are rearrangements of the letters of another name or word. Anadromes (also called reversals or ananyms) are other names or words spelled backwards. Technically, a reversal is also an anagram, but the two are derived by different methods, so they are listed separately.

Anagrams

Place names created by anagramming fall into three distinct groups:

 Single letters swapped Sometimes this is due to a typo that did not get fixed. Others are just to make a different name, but not too different, from the original.
 Syllables swapped Usually based on someone's surname.
 Well mixed combinations When a completely different name was desired.

Anagram-like constructions of place names

A few places names were constructed by arranging a preselected set of letters in an order that made a pronounceable name.

Anadromes

Imperfect ananyms

See also
 Anagram
 Ananym
 List of geographic acronyms and initialisms
 List of geographic portmanteaus

References

anagram